The men's 4 x 100 metres relay at the 1971 European Athletics Championships was held in Helsinki, Finland, at Helsinki Olympic Stadium on 14 and 15 August 1971.

Medalists

Results

Final
15 August

Heats
14 August

Heat 1

Heat 2

Participation
According to an unofficial count, 40 athletes from 10 countries participated in the event.

 (4)
 (4)
 (4)
 (4)
 (4)
 (4)
 (4)
 (4)
 (4)
 (4)

References

4 x 100 metres relay
Relays at the European Athletics Championships